The 2007 ICC World Twenty20 Final was a Twenty20 International cricket match played between India and Pakistan at the Wanderers Stadium, Johannesburg, South Africa. Administered by the International Cricket Council (ICC) it was the culmination of the 2007 ICC World Twenty20 which was the inaugural edition of the tournament. India won by defeating Pakistan by five runs. The teams had previously played each other in a Group-D match of the tournament, which was also won by India.

Road to the final

In Group D, after initial games against Scotland, rivals India and Pakistan met at Kingsmead Cricket Ground, Durban, South Africa. After India got to 141 for 9 in their twenty overs, a Misbah-ul-Haq run-out on the last ball of the game saw the match head into a bowl-out which India won 3–0 with Virender Sehwag, Harbhajan Singh and Robin Uthappa scoring for India.

In the Super 8s, India lost to New Zealand by 10 runs. India then defeated England and host South Africa by 18 and 37 runs. Meanwhile, Pakistan beat Sri Lanka by 33 runs. Pakistan also defeated Australia and chased Bangladesh to win by four wickets.

The first semi-final was a tight contest between Pakistan and New Zealand, which Pakistan won by six wickets. India faced Australia in the second semi-final match, the lead alternating until India turned it around to win their spot in the final.

Team composition 
The Indian team made one change from their semi-final against Australia: Yusuf Pathan went into the lineup to replace Virender Sehwag, who was unavailable for fitness issues. Pakistan also had one change with Fawad Alam being dropped as he was replaced by Yasir_Arafat_(cricketer).

Super Final match

Officials 
Simon Taufel and Mark Benson were the on-field umpires and Daryl Harper was the third umpire, while Ranjan Madugalle was selected as the match referee.

Match summary 
After winning the coin toss and electing to bat first, India lost their opening wicket in the third over when Yusuf Pathan mistimed his shot to be caught by Shoaib Malik for 15. The next wicket to fall was Robin Uthappa, with another mistimed shot ending his innings on eight. Settling down, Gautam Gambhir played his shots (he achieved top score for India with 75 from 54 balls including 8 fours and 2 sixes). On the other end, Yuvraj Singh was caught out from a Umar Gul delivery to end the 63-run partnership. After MS Dhoni was bowled by Gul for 6, the innings slowed between over 14 to 18. Rohit Sharma made some late-order hitting which brought India to 157 for 5 in the twenty overs. For Pakistan, Gul was the best of the bowlers as he took three wickets while Asif and Sohail Tanvir each took a wicket.

In the run chase, Pakistan lost Hafeez in the first over while Akmal was bowled by an in-swinger from R. P. Singh. After a twenty-one run-over from S. Sreesanth, Imran Nazir was run out Robin Uthappa on 31, which started a brief collapse with the wickets of Younis Khan, Shoaib Malik and Yasir Arafat putting Pakistan to 77 for 6. Misbah-ul-Haq remained strong at the other end with support from the tail-enders, and reached within thirteen runs of the target; however, he lost his wicket, with the gamble of going over short-fine leg ending in a Sreesanth catch. This resulted in India winning by five runs. The pick of the bowlers was Irfan Pathan and R. P. Singh, who each collected three wickets; Joginder Sharma and S. Sreesanth also got into the wickets with two and one, respectively.

Scorecard 
 Toss: India won the toss and decided to bat first
 Result: India won by 5 runs

Fall of wickets: 1–25 (Y K Pathan, 2.4 over), 2–40 (Uthappa, 5.4 over), 3–103 (Yuvraj Singh, 13.3 over), 4–111 (Dhoni, 15.2 over), 5–130 (Gambhir, 17.6 over)

Did not bat: Harbhajan Singh, Joginder Sharma, S Sreesanth, R. P. Singh

Fall of wickets: 1–2 (Mohammad Hafeez, 0.5 over), 2–26 (Kamran Akmal, 2.3 over), 3–53 (Imran Nazir, 5.4 over), 4–65 (Younis Khan, 8.3 over), 5–76 (Shoaib Malik, 11.3 over), 6–77 (Shahid Afridi, 11.4 over), 7–104 (Yasir Arafat, 15.6 over), 8–138 (Sohail Tanvir, 17.6 over), 9–141 (Umar Gul, 18.5 over), 10–152 (Misbah-ul-Haq, 19.3 over)

Aftermath
After the match, Indian captain MS Dhoni remarked that "Twenty20 will be huge in India." Pakistan captain Shoaib Malik blamed "luck" and apologized to "Muslims all over the world" for the defeat, drawing sharp criticism from Muslim leaders and sportspeople in India.

On 26 September, the Indian team was greeted with a warm welcome by the fans upon their return to India. The players took a 30-kilometre open bus ride from the Mumbai Airport to the Wankhede Stadium, where they were felicitated by the Board of Control for Cricket in India (BCCI). The players were rewarded  each, while Yuvraj Singh was gifted an additional  and a Porsche 911.

In Pakistan, the loss was met with agitation by several fans who formed mobs, raised slogans and burned effigies of the players. In Lahore, effigies of Shahid Afridi and Younis Khan were burned at the football stadium which was hosting the 2007 AFC President's Cup.

See also
 2011 Cricket World Cup 2nd semi-final
 2017 ICC Champions Trophy Final

References

External links

Final
ICC Men's T20 World Cup Finals
International cricket competitions in 2007
India–Pakistan cricket rivalry at Finals